Kaluga Governorate (1796–1929) was a governorate of the Russian Empire and the Russian SFSR. Its capital was Kaluga.

Administrative division
Kaluga Governorate consisted of the following uyezds (administrative centres in parentheses):
 Borovsky Uyezd (Borovsk)
 Zhizdrinsky Uyezd (Zhizdra)
 Kaluzhsky Uyezd (Kaluga)
 Kozelsky Uyezd (Kozelsk)
 Likhvinsky Uyezd (Likhvin)
 Maloyaroslavetsky Uyezd (Maloyaroslavets)
 Medynsky Uyezd (Medyn)
 Meshchovsky Uyezd (Meshchovsk)
 Mosalsky Uyezd (Mosalsk)
 Peremyshlsky Uyezd (Peremyshl)
 Tarussky Uyezd (Tarusa)

Demographics
At the time of the Russian Empire Census of 1897, Kaluga Governorate had a population of 1,132,843. Of these, 99.4% spoke Russian, 0.2% Polish, 0.1% Yiddish, 0.1% Ukrainian, 0.1% Belarusian and 0.1% German as their native language.

References

Further reading
 

 
Governorates of the Russian Empire
Governorates of the Russian Soviet Federative Socialist Republic